Miao Huaxu (born 4 July 2000) is a Chinese footballer currently playing as a midfielder for Hunan Billows.

Club career
Miao spent most of his youth career in Spain, including a spell with Atlético Madrid between 2016 and 2018. He spent time with CD Serranos' B team, scoring four goals in nineteen appearances.

He returned to China with the Qingdao Red Lions in 2021.

Career statistics

Club
.

References

2000 births
Living people
Chinese footballers
Chinese expatriate footballers
Association football midfielders
China League Two players
Dalian Professional F.C. players
Valencia CF players
Atlético Madrid footballers
Chinese expatriate sportspeople in Spain
Expatriate footballers in Spain